Velichamillatha Veedhi is a 1984 Indian Malayalam film, directed by Jose Kallen and produced by Aravind K. Varma. The film stars Sukumari, Venu Nagavally, Menaka and Indira in the lead roles. The film has musical score by K. P. Udayabhanu.

Cast
Sukumari
Venu Nagavally
Menaka
Indira
Mala Aravindan
Nellikode Bhaskaran
Shanavas
Aravind K. Varma

Soundtrack
The music was composed by K. P. Udayabhanu and the lyrics were written by Vellanad Narayanan.

References

External links
 

1984 films
1980s Malayalam-language films